Senator Washington may refer to:

Craig Washington (born 1941), Texas State Senate
Harold Washington (1922–1987), Illinois State Senate
LeAnna Washington (born 1945), Pennsylvania State Senate
Mary L. Washington (born 1962), Maryland State Senate
Maurice Washington (born 1956), Nevada State Senate
McKinley Washington Jr. (born 1936), South Carolina State Senate

See also
Washington State Senate
Washington Senators (disambiguation)